Quantang Town is an urban town in Xiangxiang City, Hunan Province, People's Republic of China.

Villages
The town is divided into 47 villages and one community, the following areas: Quantang Community, Fanyu, Lvtang, Qingshan, Qianchong, Tongsheng, Tongrui, Shahe, Xindong, Xinyang, Wangjia, Fanrong, Huawu, Nansou, Chuangtang, Xianhua, Baiquan, Quantang, Shuangli, Shan'ao, Shijiang, Dongling, Xiling, Xintian, Linchang, Xiongxin, Jinpin, Wu'ai, Biaoji, Gaowu, Desheng, Liangjia, Sanjiao, Tuotang, Xiawan, Shuangtuo, Xingyu, Xitai, Huawu, Niwan, Hushan, Tuonan, Longling, Juntang, Qiaowan, Shanghu, Shiwu, and Chenglian.

References

External links

Divisions of Xiangxiang